Kroksjö can mean:

 Kroksjö, Lycksele Municipality, Sweden
 Kroksjö, Umeå Municipality, Sweden